The Mpandi Formation is a geological formation in Zimbabwe. It dates back to the Late Triassic to Early Jurassic.

Fossil content 

Other fossils
 Massospondylus sp.
 Rauisuchidae indet.

See also 
 List of dinosaur-bearing rock formations
 List of fossiliferous stratigraphic units in Zimbabwe
 Geology of Zimbabwe
 Beaufort Group
 Pebbly Arkose Formation

References

Further reading 
 D. Munyikwa. 1997. Faunal analysis of Karoo-aged sediments in the northern Limpopo Valley, Zimbabwe. Arnoldia Zimbabwe 10(13):129-140

Geologic formations of Zimbabwe
Triassic System of Africa
Jurassic System of Africa
Sandstone formations
Fluvial deposits
Paleontology in Zimbabwe